Alaproclate (developmental code name GEA-654) is a drug that was being developed as an antidepressant by the Swedish pharmaceutical company Astra AB (now AstraZeneca) in the 1970s. It acts as a selective serotonin reuptake inhibitor (SSRI), and along with zimelidine and indalpine, was one of the first of its kind. Development was discontinued due to the observation of liver complications in rodent studies. In addition to its SSRI properties, alaproclate has been found to act as a non-competitive NMDA receptor antagonist, but does not have discriminative stimulus properties similar to phencyclidine.

Synthesis
Method for Treatment of Senile Dementia:

The Grignard reaction between methyl 4-chlorophenylacetate [52449-43-1] (1) with methylmagnesium iodide gives 1-(4-chlorophenyl)-2-methyl-2-propanol [5468-97-3] (2). Acylation with 2-bromopropionyl bromide [563-76-8] (3) gives [1-(4-Chlorophenyl)-2-methylpropan-2-yl] 2-bromopropanoate, CID:13695101 (3). Displacement of halogen with ammonia leads to alaproclate (4).

See also
 Femoxetine
 Indalpine
 Zimelidine

References

Antidepressants
Chloroarenes
Propionate esters
NMDA receptor antagonists
Selective serotonin reuptake inhibitors
Abandoned drugs